Colin Francis Forbes (16 August 1932 – 25 July 2021) was a rugby union player who represented Australia.

Forbes, a prop, was born in Brisbane, Queensland and claimed a total of 6 international rugby caps for Australia. His death was announced in July 2021.

References

1932 births
2021 deaths
Australian rugby union players
Australia international rugby union players
Rugby union players from Brisbane
Rugby union props